Thoddoo FC is a football club based in Maldives that plays in the Dhiraagu Dhivehi League.

Stadium
Currently the team plays at the 11,000 seater Rasmee Dhandu Stadium.

League participations
Dhivehi League: 2009–10
Second Division Football Tournament: 2010–11

Notable players
Ahmed Zaad
Moosa Yaamin
Mohamed Nizam

References

External links
Soccerway
Rsssf
Weltfuball

Football clubs in the Maldives